Bruce Irons may refer to:

Bruce Irons (engineer) (1924–1983), Canadian engineer and mathematician
Bruce Irons (surfer) (born 1979), American surfer

See also
Irons (disambiguation)